Zatrephes arenosa is a moth in the family Erebidae. It was described by William Schaus in 1905. It is found in French Guiana.

References

Phaegopterina
Moths described in 1905